In geometry, the elongated pentagonal bipyramid or pentakis pentagonal prism is one of the Johnson solids. As the name suggests, it can be constructed by elongating a pentagonal bipyramid by inserting a pentagonal prism between its congruent halves.

Dual polyhedron 

The dual of the elongated square bipyramid is a pentagonal bifrustum.

See also 
 Elongated pentagonal pyramid

External links 
 

Johnson solids
Pyramids and bipyramids